Tue Bjørn Thomsen (December 21, 1972 – April 23, 2006) was a professional boxer from Denmark, whose best performance as an amateur was winning the bronze medal at the 1997 World Amateur Boxing Championships in Budapest, Hungary. Born in Egedesminde, Greenland to family of  Danish and Icelandic heritage, he made his professional debut in late 1997. On March 31, 2000 he won the vacant IBC Super Cruiserweight Title by defeating Nate Miller of the United States, in the Esbjerg Stadionhal in Esbjerg, Denmark. On April 23, 2006, Thomsen was knifed to death during a bar fight in central Copenhagen.

Professional boxing record

|-
|align="center" colspan=8|22 Wins (9 knockouts, 13 decisions), 1 Loss (1 knockout), 1 Draw 
|-
| align="center" style="border-style: none none solid solid; background: #e3e3e3"|Result
| align="center" style="border-style: none none solid solid; background: #e3e3e3"|Record
| align="center" style="border-style: none none solid solid; background: #e3e3e3"|Opponent
| align="center" style="border-style: none none solid solid; background: #e3e3e3"|Type
| align="center" style="border-style: none none solid solid; background: #e3e3e3"|Round
| align="center" style="border-style: none none solid solid; background: #e3e3e3"|Date
| align="center" style="border-style: none none solid solid; background: #e3e3e3"|Location
| align="center" style="border-style: none none solid solid; background: #e3e3e3"|Notes
|-align=center
|Draw
|
|align=left| Carlos Eduardo Balduino de Melo
|TD
|1
|25/10/2002
|align=left| Esbjerg Stadionhal, Esbjerg
|align=left|
|-
|Win
|
|align=left| Rob Calloway
|UD
|12
|21/09/2001
|align=left| Idraettens hus, Vejle
|align=left|
|-
|Win
|
|align=left| Bradley Rone
|UD
|6
|16/06/2001
|align=left| Brøndby Hall, Brøndby
|align=left|
|-
|Win
|
|align=left| Curtis McDorman
|TKO
|5
|27/04/2001
|align=left| Aalborg Hallen, Aalborg
|align=left|
|-
|Loss
|
|align=left| Jacob Mofokeng
|KO
|4
|26/05/2000
|align=left| Holbaek Stadionhal, Holbaek
|align=left|
|-
|Win
|
|align=left| Nate Miller
|TD
|10
|31/03/2000
|align=left| Esbjerg Stadionhal, Esbjerg
|align=left|
|-
|Win
|
|align=left| Mike Sedillo
|KO
|4
|18/02/2000
|align=left| Aalborg Hallen, Aalborg
|align=left|
|-
|Win
|
|align=left| Pedro Daniel Franco
|UD
|8
|26/11/1999
|align=left| Viborg Stadionhal, Viborg, Denmark
|align=left|
|-
|Win
|
|align=left| Mark L. Bradley
|KO
|2
|29/10/1999
|align=left| K.B. Hallen, Copenhagen
|align=left|
|-
|Win
|
|align=left| Joey Guy
|PTS
|6
|01/10/1999
|align=left| Randers Hallen, Randers
|align=left|
|-
|Win
|
|align=left| Cleveland Woods
|UD
|6
|03/09/1999
|align=left| K.B. Hallen, Copenhagen
|align=left|
|-
|Win
|
|align=left| Mark Hulstrom
|UD
|8
|18/06/1999
|align=left| Idraettens hus, Vejle
|align=left|
|-
|Win
|
|align=left| Tony LaRosa
|PTS
|6
|04/05/1999
|align=left| Cirkusbygningen, Copenhagen
|align=left|
|-
|Win
|
|align=left| Tim "Scrap Iron" Johnson
|KO
|1
|16/04/1999
|align=left| K.B. Hallen, Copenhagen
|align=left|
|-
|Win
|
|align=left| Marcial Vinicio
|PTS
|6
|19/03/1999
|align=left| Falconer Centret, Copenhagen
|align=left|
|-
|Win
|
|align=left| Kimmuel Odum
|TKO
|1
|27/11/1998
|align=left| Vejby-Risskov Hallen, Aarhus
|align=left|
|-
|Win
|
|align=left| Iran Barkley
|UD
|6
|06/11/1998
|align=left| K.B. Hallen, Copenhagen
|align=left|
|-
|Win
|
|align=left| Rodney Phillips
|KO
|1
|16/10/1998
|align=left| Aalborg Hallen, Aalborg
|align=left|
|-
|Win
|
|align=left| Damon Reed
|UD
|4
|04/09/1998
|align=left| Kolding-Hallen, Kolding
|align=left|
|-
|Win
|
|align=left| Mike Pearman
|TKO
|4
|05/06/1998
|align=left| K.B. Hallen, Copenhagen
|align=left|
|-
|Win
|
|align=left| Steve Kondas
|TKO
|2
|01/05/1998
|align=left| Kolding Teater, Kolding
|align=left|
|-
|Win
|
|align=left| Lanardo Peoples
|UD
|4
|03/04/1998
|align=left| Holbaek Stadionhal, Holbaek
|align=left|
|-
|Win
|
|align=left| Jimmy Haynes
|KO
|1
|20/03/1998
|align=left| Vejby-Risskov Hallen, Aarhus
|align=left|
|-
|Win
|
|align=left| Aljenon DeBose
|PTS
|4
|05/12/1997
|align=left| Aalborg Hallen, Aalborg
|align=left|
|}

References

External links
 

1972 births
2006 deaths
Cruiserweight boxers
World boxing champions
Male murder victims
Danish murder victims
People murdered in Denmark
Danish male boxers
AIBA World Boxing Championships medalists